Mount Moa is a mountain rising above  at the northern end of the Churchill Mountains in Antarctica. Located above Kiwi Pass and at the southern end of Kent Plateau, it was named after an extinct and flightless bird species in New Zealand, the moa (Dinornis gigantea). The naming is in association with the adjacent feature, Kiwi Pass, which was named after a familiar nickname for New Zealanders, the kiwi being also a species of flightless bird (currently endangered and protected) found only in New Zealand.

References

Mountains of Oates Land